Diamond Creek may refer to:

 Diamond Creek, Victoria, a suburb of Melbourne, Australia, named from the tributary of the Yarra River
 Diamond Creek Football Club
 Diamond Creek Trail, a path that follows the creek
 Diamond Creek railway station
 Diamond Creek (Arizona), a tributary of the Colorado River in Arizona
 Diamond Creek (California), a tributary of the South Yuba River

See also
 Diamond Valley (disambiguation)